Isoflurothyl is a fluorinated ether related to the inhalational convulsant flurothyl. It is the structural isomer of flurothyl. Unlike flurothyl, however, isoflurothyl is a general anesthetic.

See also
Convulsant
Flurothyl
Sevoflurane

References

General anesthetics
Ethers
Trifluoromethyl compounds
GABAA receptor positive allosteric modulators
Glycine receptor agonists